Teemu Salo (born 11 February 1974) is a Finnish curler from Hyvinkää. He has played lead position for Markku Uusipaavalniemi since 2002.

Salo won a silver medal as a member of Uusipaavaliemi's team at the 2006 Winter Olympics. He won a gold medal at the 2005 European Mixed Curling Championship playing second for Uusipaavalniemi.

In 2009, he played for Kalle Kiiskinen at the World Curling Championships.

Teams

References

External links

1974 births
People from Hyvinkää
Finnish male curlers
Living people
Curlers at the 2006 Winter Olympics
Olympic curlers of Finland
Olympic silver medalists for Finland
Olympic medalists in curling
Medalists at the 2006 Winter Olympics
Continental Cup of Curling participants
Sportspeople from Uusimaa